Fiona O'Malley (born 19 January 1968) is a former Irish politician who served as a Senator from 2007 to 2011, after being nominated by the Taoiseach. She served as a Teachta Dála (TD) for the Dún Laoghaire constituency from 2002 to 2007.

Political career
O'Malley comes from a political family. Her father, Desmond O'Malley, was a former Fianna Fáil cabinet minister and founder of the Progressive Democrats. Her granduncle, Donogh O'Malley, was a Fianna Fáil minister in the 1960s. She is also a cousin of another former Progressive Democrats TD, Tim O'Malley.

A graduate of Trinity College Dublin and City University London, she worked as an Arts Administrator before entering politics and as a Personal assistant to Liz O'Donnell from 1998 to 2000. Her first political position was as elected member of the Dún Laoghaire–Rathdown County Council from 1999. She was elected to Dáil Éireann for the Dún Laoghaire constituency at the 2002 general election. She resigned her council seat in 2003 when the dual mandate came into effect.

She was a member of the Oireachtas Committee on Arts, Sports and Tourism and the Oireachtas Committee on Health and Children. She was also a member of the Dáil All-Party group concerned with matters of sexual and reproductive health. She has travelled to South America and South Africa with the United Nations Population Fund and has spoken extensively of the need for a clear safe sex message both in Ireland and in the developing world.

She lost her Dáil seat at the 2007 general election, but was nominated by the Taoiseach, Bertie Ahern to the Seanad in August 2007. She was narrowly defeated in the race to become the leader of the Progressive Democrats by Ciarán Cannon.

She was an Independent politician from the dissolution of the Progressive Democrats in 2009. She was an independent candidate at the 2011 Seanad election for the Dublin University constituency but was not elected.

See also
Families in the Oireachtas

References

 

1968 births
Living people
Alumni of Trinity College Dublin
Alumni of City, University of London
Local councillors in Dún Laoghaire–Rathdown
Members of the 23rd Seanad
21st-century women members of Seanad Éireann
Members of the 29th Dáil
21st-century women Teachtaí Dála
People from Dún Laoghaire
Politicians from County Limerick
Progressive Democrats TDs
Nominated members of Seanad Éireann
Progressive Democrats senators